Pittsfield Township may refer to the following places in the United States:

 Pittsfield Township, Pike County, Illinois
 Pittsfield Charter Township, Michigan
 Pittsfield Township, Lorain County, Ohio
 Pittsfield Township, Warren County, Pennsylvania

See also

Pittsfield (disambiguation)
	
Township name disambiguation pages